The Salem Ice Dogs were an American junior ice hockey organization based in Salem, Massachusetts.

Junior B EmJHL Team

The organization fielded a team in the Atlantic Division of the Empire Junior B Hockey League. They played out of The Richard H. Rockett Arena at Salem State College, and briefly out of the Allied Veterans Memorial Rink in Everett, Massachusetts in their last few years.

About two dozen Salem Ice Dogs alumni had made the jump into College Hockey.

References

External links
 Official Site

Defunct ice hockey teams in the United States
Ice hockey teams in Massachusetts
Junior ice hockey teams in the United States
Salem, Massachusetts
Sports in Essex County, Massachusetts